Wessel Dammers (born 1 March 1995) is a Dutch professional footballer who plays as a centre back for Eerste Divisie side Willem II.

Club career
Dammers is a youth exponent from Feyenoord. He made his senior debut on 11 December 2014 against Standard Liège in a UEFA Europa League game. He replaced Terence Kongolo after 67 minutes in a 0–3 away win.

On 27 March 2020, Dammers signed a three-year contract with Groningen. On 29 January 2022, Dammers joined Willem II on loan until the end of the season.

On 24 August 2022, Dammers returned to Willem II on a permanent basis and signed a three-year contract.

References

External links
Profile - Voetbal International
Netherlands profile at OnsOranje

1995 births
Living people
People from Ouderkerk
Association football central defenders
Dutch footballers
Netherlands youth international footballers
Netherlands under-21 international footballers
Feyenoord players
SC Cambuur players
Fortuna Sittard players
FC Groningen players
Willem II (football club) players
Eredivisie players
Eerste Divisie players
Footballers from South Holland